István Szabácsy (1 September 1926 – 30 November 1988) was a Hungarian equestrian. He competed in two events at the 1972 Summer Olympics.

References

External links
 

1926 births
1988 deaths
Hungarian male equestrians
Olympic equestrians of Hungary
Equestrians at the 1972 Summer Olympics
Sportspeople from Tolna County